Jacob F. Mintzing was the thirty-third mayor of Charleston, South Carolina, serving from 1840 until his death in office on March 14, 1842, from stomach cancer.

Mintzing was reelected as mayor of Charleston on September 6, 1841.

References

Mayors of Charleston, South Carolina
1842 deaths
Year of birth missing
Deaths from stomach cancer